El-Khazen Tract or "El-Khazem Tract" known as Khallet el-Khazem (خلة خازن او خلة خازم) is on the southern part of the mountain of Lebanon]] with altitudes between 750m and 910m above sea level. The Tract is an area that has witnessed many historical events, from the Phoenicians to modern day Lebanon. There is a cave in the area that is similar to Jeitta Grotto, being one of the biggest in Lebanon. Streams of the Litani River pass through the land making the soil very fertile and fit for agricultural purposes. The land is covered in trees, grass, fruits, and vegetables. Wildlife is also present in the area. Being covered mainly in coniferous forests, it is a really good habitat for animals like rabbits, owls, squirrels, deer, and many others. The Brown Syrian Bear was also present in the area before being extinct or very rare in the region.
Geography of Lebanon